Queen Munjeong (Hangul: 문정왕후, Hanja: 文定王后; 2 December 1501 – 5 May 1565), of the Papyeong Yun clan, was a posthumous name bestowed to the wife and third queen consort of Yi Yeok, King Jungjong. She was queen consort of Joseon from 1517 until her husband's death in 1544, after which she was honoured as Queen Dowager Seongryeol (성렬왕대비) during the reign of her step-son, Yi Ho, King Injong. She was honored as Grand Queen Dowager Seongryeol (성렬대왕대비) during the reign of her son, Yi Hwan, King Myeongjong.

Queen Munjeong acted as regent during the minority of her son between 1545 and 1553. She was an effective administrator and the most influential supporter of Buddhism during the early Joseon dynasty. She gave out the land to the common people that had been formerly owned by the nobility. During her regency, her brother, Yun Won-hyeong, wielded enormous power to wipe out their opposition and led the Fourth Literati Purge of 1545.

Life

Early life and background
The future queen was born on 2 December 1501 during the reign of King Yeonsan. Her father, Yun Ji-Im, was member of the Papyeong Yun clan. Her mother was member of the Jeonui Lee clan. Through her father, she is a great-grandniece of Queen Jeonghyeon, and her nephew eventually married the granddaughter of Kim Ahn-ro. She was also a third cousin of Queen Janggyeong, the second spouse of her future husband.

Yeonsan deposed in 1506 and his half-brother, Jungjong, was placed on the throne as the eleventh king of Joseon by leaders of the Hungu factions, the established power elites that time, who led the coup. Jungjong royal authority was limited due to powerful presence of coup leaders who put him on the throne.

Yun Myung-hye of the Papyeong Yun clan who was Jungjong's second queen consort died in 1515 and posthumously honoured as Queen Janggyeong. Two officials from Sarim faction had petitioned the King to restore status of the Deposed Queen Sin, Jungjong's first queen consort, who was deposed by Hungu faction in 1506. The officials who belong to the Hungu faction were against the idea and even caused that two officials to be exiled. Queen Dowager Jasun who was Jungjong's mother decided to picked new queen consort from her own clan, Papyeong Yun. This decision supported by Yun Im, brother of Queen Janggyeong and uncle of her son, the Crown Prince. The Queen from the Papyeong Yun clan was expected to be the Crown Prince's protectress. So, Yun Ji-Im's daughter chosen as new queen when she was 17 years old in 1517.

Life as queen consort

After Jo Gwangjo's died and dozens of Sarim scholars were exiled during literati purge in 1520, Jungjong never had the chance to rule on his own. His reign was marked by tumultuous struggle among various conservative factions, each of them backed by one of the King's consorts. Nam Gon and Shim Jung's faction and Kim Anro's faction vied for power after Kim Anro's son married Jungjong's eldest daughter. Later Kim Anro was exiled by Nam Gon and Shim Jung for abusing power.

Although the Queen was technically king's chief consort, Jungjong's concubines were older than her and some of them had more power as prince's mother, like Park Gyeong-bin who was Prince Bokseong's mother and Hong Hui-bin who was Prince Geumwon's mother. Park Gyeong-bin was also the adoptive daughter of Park Won-jong, the maternal uncle of Queen Janggyeong. Park was also the younger brother of Grand Internal Princess Consort Seungpyeong, the wife of Grand Prince Wolsan and daughter-in-law of Queen Insu. 

Hong Hui-bin was the daughter of Hong Kyung-ju, one of the Hungu faction leaders. Hong Kyung-ju, Nam Gon and Shim Jung were collectively called "Evil Three of Gimyo" because their role in the literati purge. Park Gyeong-bin and Hong Hui-bin were supporters of the faction. The Queen barely remained her position by protecting the Crown Prince against ambitious concubines.

During her early years as queen, she had a bad relationship with Park Gyeong-bin who devised a plan to place Bokseong to the throne and the Queen opposed it. Park Gyeong-bin was also plotting all sorts of conspiracy to monopolize Jungjong's love. On the other hand, the Queen herself gave birth to three daughters and had no son for 17 years despite Jungjong's expectation to have a prince. Hong Hee-bin herself lost her prominence after her father's death in 1522.

After Kim An-ro returned from exile after Nam Gon's death, he accused Shim Jung accepting bribes from Park Gyeong-bin to help her put Bokseong on the throne. Later he framed Shim Jung and Gyeong-bin on the charge of cursing the Crown Prince. Later Shim Jung, Park Gyeong-bin and Prince Bokseong were executed in 1533. In 1534, the Queen herself finally gave birth to a son, Yi Hwan, Grand Prince Gyeongwon (경원대군). In the name of protecting the Crown Prince, Kim An-ro attempted to depose the Queen because her son was considered a threat for the Crown Prince, but the Queen noticed the plot beforehand and persuaded the King to get rid of him instead. It made her realize again that it's useless to be in the position without real power.

Kim An-ro was executed in 1537. After that, Yun Im and the Queen's brothers, Yun Won-ro and Yun Won-hyeong filled the power vacuum. Many officials gathered around the two centers of power and developed into separate political factions. Yun Im's faction became known as 'Greater Yun' and the Yun brothers' faction as 'Lesser Yun.' Many Sarim scholars joined the Greater Yun since they had great hopes for the Crown Prince, who studied under Jo Gwang-jo and Yi Hwang.

Although the Crown Prince was the Queen's political protector for a long time, he turned into a political enemy that she should get rid of for the future of her own son. The Annals of the Joseon Dynasty tells the story of the Queen who threatened the Crown Prince to not to kill her brothers and her own son. Her hostility was not only because her ambition, but also from Yun Im's and late Kim An-ro's manipulation to get rid of the Queen.

King Injong's reign

Jungjong died in 1544 and the Crown Prince ascended to the throne as 12th king of Joseon (temple name: Injong). The Queen was honoured as Queen Dowager Seongryeol. She expressed her dissatisfaction in many aspects but couldn't directly confront Yun Im who was exercising immense power at the time. Injong dismissed Yun Won-hyeong and Yun Won-ro from their positions after they were impeached by the Greater Yun faction, but they failed to wipe out their opposition completely, since Seongryeol protected the Lesser Yun faction and other opposition officials.

Many in the Sarim faction believed that Injong was poisoned by Seongryeol, but there is no evidence that this was the case. According to unofficial chronicles, there is a tale of Seongryeol finally showing love for her "adoptive" son Injong, after decades of polite indifference (in reality behind-the-scenes hatred).

As Injong went to pay his morning respects, Munjeong’s face started radiating with a smile only a mother could give to her child. Injong took it as a sign that the Queen dowager was finally acknowledging him as the king, and in particular as her own son. He ate the ddeok that his step-mother gave him, not knowing that it would be the beginning of the end. He fell ill slowly, not enough to create any suspicion, but quickly enough that historians would later pick up on the event. Three days passed before Injong mysteriously died (after only 9 months of rule).

The chronicles also tell that Seongryeol was frequently visited by spirits at night after Injong's death. So disturbed was she that she moved her residence from Gyeongbok Palace to Changdeok Palace.

Regency

After Injong's death in 1545, Grand Prince Gyeongwon ascended to the throne as 13th king of Joseon (temple name: Myeongjong). As the young King's mother and grand queen dowager, Seongryeol acted as regent.

Yun Won-hyeong was reinstated and wielded enormous power. Yun Won-hyeong accused Yun Im and his supporters of plotting to put another prince instead of Myeongjong on the throne after Injong's death. This accusations and rumors of Yun Im's treason led to the Fourth Literati Purge of 1545, in which the prince, Yun Im, and nine of his supporters including Sarim scholars were executed. After this initial purge, Yun Won-hyeong continued to purge his rivals and Sarim scholars over next five years until the total death toll surpassed one hundred. Even he also impeached his older brother, Yun Won-Ro, who was executed a few days later along with his followers in 1546. Facing no opposition from the government, Yun Won-hyeong became Minister of Personnel (이조판서) in 1548, Left State Councilor in 1551 and ultimately Chief State Councilor (영의정) in 1563.

Despite Yun Won-hyeong's violent rule, Grand Queen Dowager Seongryeol was an effective administrator and continued to rule even after her son reached the age of majority, distributing to the common people land formerly owned by the nobility. She was also the most influential supporter of Buddhism during the early dynasty. Throughout the Joseon period, Buddhism had been actively discouraged and suppressed by the Neo-Confucianist government. Buddhist monks were treated as thought they were on the same social level as slaves, and were not allowed to enter the gates of the capital city. She lifted the official ban on Buddhist worship and instigated an impressive revival of Buddhism.

Buddhist Paintings

She commissioned 400 Buddhist artworks and the aim of the commission was to commemorate the opening of Hoeam Temple. The project was started in 1563 and was completed two years later.

The massive commission involved 100 scrolls on each of 4 triads:
 The Historical Buddha Triad (Sanskrit: शाक्यमुनि Śākyamuni; Korean: 석가모니/석가 seokgamoni/seokga)
 The Buddha of the Western Paradise Triad (अमिताभ Amitābha; 아미타불 amitabul)
 The Buddha of the Future Triad (मैत्रेय Maitreya; 미륵보살 mireukbosal)
 The Medicine Buddha Triad (भैषज्यगुरु Bhaiṣajyaguru; 약사여래/약사불 yaksayeorae/yaksabul)
In each set of 100-50 were executed in colors and gold, the other 50 in gold only.

As of 2009, only 6 of the commissioned 400 are still extant.
1 painting in the Sakyamuni Triad – made in 1565, formerly belonging to the Hoeam Temple, discovered in Japan (in excellent condition), and purchased and kept by the Mary Jackson Burke Collection in 1990 in New York. The painting is considered by experts in the field and in the Buddhist community to be one of the most important and representative Buddhist artworks produced during the Dynasty.
1 painting in the Bhaisajyaguru Triad – currently on display at the National Museum of Korea.
4 paintings are in Japan.
1 painting in the Sakyamuni Triad
3 paintings in the Bhaisajyaguru Triad

Buddhist temples

Buddhist temples served as another proof of Seongryeol's zealous aim of the revival of Buddhism. The cornerstone of the revival of Buddhism is the Bongeun-sa Temple (a major center of Zen Buddhism).

Bongeun-sa was established in 794 by Ven. Yeon-hoe, and was originally called Gyeonseong-sa. It was rebuilt in 1498 (by Queen Jeonghyeon's patronage) and renamed Bongeun-sa; in 1562 it was moved about 1 km to its current location and rebuilt. Its fate was destruction by fire (1592 and 1637) and repetitive rebuilding and renovations (1637, 1692, 1912, 1941, and 1981). A three-story stone stupa enshrines the Sari of Sakyamuni Buddha, brought from Sri Lanka in 1975.

The temple fell into decline during the late Goryeo era, but was reconstructed in 1498. Before the reconstruction, Buddhism fell under severe state-imposed oppression as the government maintained Neo-Confucianism as the sole state ideal. With Seongryeol's strong support for the re-awakening of Buddhism, she reconstructed Bongeun-sa and it was to become a cornerstone for early-Joseon Buddhist revival.

Ven. Bo-woo played a key role at this critical period, having been assigned as the Chief Monk of Bongeun-sa in 1548. He revived an official system of training and selecting monks in both the Seon (meditation) and Gyo (doctrinal, scholastic) sects of Korean Buddhism. In 1551, Bongeun-sa became the main temple of the Jogye Seon Order, then soon became the main base for the overall restoration of Korean Buddhism. This revived training system produced such illustrious monks as Ven. Seo-san, Ven. Sa-myeong, and Ven. Byeok-am. However, after Seongryeol died, Ven. Bo-woo was killed by anti-Buddhist officials.

Death
Grand Queen Dowager Seongryeol died in 1565 during the reign of her son. She had wanted to be buried at Jeongneung along with her husband, but the land around Jeongneung was low and prone to flooding and she was buried instead in the Taeneung Royal Tomb. She posthumously honoured as Queen Munjeong.

After her death, Yun Won-hyeong lost all political power and exiled from the capital. Unable to make a political comeback, he and his second wife, Jeong Nan-jeong, committed suicide by poison.

It's said that within the queens who were involved in Joseon Dynasty politics, Queen Munjeong, along with Queen Wongyeong, Queen Myeongseong, and Empress Myeongseong, were considered the most political, bold, and broad-minded Queens of their time.

Family
Parent

 Father − Yun Ji-Im (1475 – 14 April 1534) (윤지임)
 1) Grandfather − Yun Uk (1459 – 1485) (윤욱, 尹頊)
 2) Great-Grandfather − Yun Gye-Gyeom (1442 – 1483) (윤계겸)
 3) Great-Great-Grandfather − Yun Sa-Heun (1422 – 1485) (윤사흔, 尹士昐); younger brother to Queen Jeonghui
 4) Great-Great-Great-Grandfather − Yun Beon (1384 – 1448) (윤번), Prime Minister during the reign of King Sejo of Joseon
 4) Great-Great-Great-Grandmother − Grand Internal Princess Consort Heungnyeong of the Incheon Lee clan (흥녕부대부인 인천 이씨, 興寧府大夫人 仁川 李氏) (1383 – 1456)
 3) Great-Great-Grandmother − Lady Kim of the Gyerim Kim clan (계림 김씨)
 1) Grandmother − Lady Jeong of the Yeongil Jeong clan (영일 정씨) (? – 1520)
 Mother − Internal Princess Consort Jeonseong of the Jeonui Lee clan (전성부부인 전의 이씨, 全城府夫人 全義李氏) (1475 – 1511)
 Grandfather - Lee Deok-sung (이덕숭, 李德崇)
 Grandmother - Lady Hong of the Namyang Hong clan (남양 홍씨, 南陽 洪氏)

Siblings

 Older brother − Yun Won-Gae (윤원개, 尹元凱)
 Sister-in-law − Lady Yi of the Jeonju Yi clan
 Nephew − Yun Gi (윤기, 尹紀)
 Nephew − Yun Kang (윤강, 尹綱)
 Niece − Lady Yun (윤씨)
 Nephew-in-law: Gu Yun (구윤, 具潤) of the Neungseung Gu clan
 Older brother − Yun Won-Ryang (1495 – 1569) (윤원량, 尹元亮)
 Sister-in-law − Lady Jang of the Suncheon Jang clan (순천 장씨)
 Nephew − Yun So (윤소, 尹紹) (1515 – 1544)
 Grandniece − Lady Yun (윤씨, 尹氏) (? – October 1566)
 Nephew − Yun Chan (윤찬, 尹纘)
 Nephew − Yun Chi (윤치, 尹緻)
 Niece − Royal Noble Consort Suk of the Papyeong Yun clan (숙빈 윤씨, 淑嬪 尹氏) (? – 1595)
 Older brother − Yun Won-Pil (1496 – 9 May 1547) (윤원필, 尹元弼)
 Sister-in-law − Lady Jeong of the Gyeongju Jeong clan (경주 정씨)
 Nephew − Yun Yun (윤윤, 尹綸)
 Nephew − Yun Wi (윤위, 尹緯)
 Nephew − Yun Hoe (윤회, 尹繪)
 Nephew − Yun Jib (윤집, 尹緝)
 Older brother − Yun Won-Ro (? – 1547) (윤원로, 尹元老)
 Sister-in-law − Lady Yi of the Jeonju Yi clan (전주 이씨)
 Sister-in-law − Lady Yi of the Pyeongchang Yi clan (평창 이씨)
 Nephew − Yun Baek-won (윤백원, 尹百源) (1528 – 1589)
 Niece-in-law − Lady Kim Seon-ok (김선옥, 金善玉) of the Yeonan Kim clan (1531 – ?)
 Grandniece − Yun Gaemichi (개미치) (? – 1589)
 Unnamed Great-Grandnephew 
 Niece-in-law − Lady Bok-yi (복이)
 Grandnephew − Yun Deok-gyeong (윤덕경)
 Nephew − Yun Cheon-won (윤천원, 尹千源)
 Nephew − Yun Man-won (윤만원, 尹萬源)
 Sister-in-law − Lady Min of the Yeoheung Min clan (여흥 민씨)
 Nephew: Yun Jo-won (윤조원)
 Older sister − Lady Yun (윤씨)
 Younger brother − Yun Won-Hyeong (1503 – 18 November 1565) (윤원형, 尹元衡)
 Sister-in-law − Lady Kim of the Yeonan Kim clan (연안 김씨)
 Nephew − Yun Seol (윤설, 尹紲)
 Nephew − Yun Hyo-won (윤효원, 尹孝源)
 Nephew − Yun Chong-won (윤충원, 尹忠源)
 Grandnephew − Yun Myeon (윤면)
 Nephew − Yun Dam-yeon (윤담연, 尹覃淵)
 Niece-in-law − Lady Yi
 Niece-in-law − Lady Kim
 Sister-in-law − Jeong Nan-Jeong (? – 13 November 1565) (정난정, 鄭允謙) of the Chogye Jeong clan 
 Niece − Lady Yun (윤씨, 尹氏)
 Younger half-brother − Yun Ji-sun (윤지손, 尹支孫)
 Younger half-brother − Yun Seo-sun (윤서손, 尹庶孫)
 Younger half-brother − Yun Bang-sun (윤방손, 尹傍孫)
 Younger half-brother − Yun Jeo-sun (윤저손, 尹低孫)
 Younger half-sister − Lady Yun (윤씨, 尹氏)

Husband

 Yi Yeok, King Jungjong (16 April 1488 – 29 November 1544) (조선 중종)
 Father-in-law − Yi Hyeol, King Seongjong (성종대왕, 成宗大王) (19 August 1457 – 19 January 1495)
 Mother-in-law − Queen Jeonghyeon of the Papyeong Yun clan (정현왕후 윤씨, 貞顯王后 尹氏) (21 July 1462 – 13 September 1530)

Children

 Daughter − Yi Ok-hye (이옥혜, 李玉惠), Princess Uihye (의혜공주) (1521 – 1564). Husband: Han Gyeong-rok (한경록, 韓景祿)
 Grandson − Han Ui (한의, 韓漪)
 Great-grandson − Han Sa-seong (한사성, 韓師聖)
 Great-grandson − Han Sa-deok (한사덕, 韓師德) (1575 – 1629)
 Grandson − Han Wan (한완, 韓浣)
 Grandson − Han Sun (한순, 韓淳)
 Granddaughter − Lady Han
 Daughter − Yi Ok-ryeon (이옥련, 李玉蓮), Princess Hyosun (효순공주) (1522 – 1538). Husband: Gu Sa-yeon (구사안, 具思顔) of the Neungseung Gu clan (1523 – 22 April 1562)
 Unnamed grandson (1538 – 1538); miscarriage
 Adoptive grandson − Gu Hong (구홍, 具弘)
 Unnamed child (1528)
 Daughter − Yi Ok-hyeon (이옥현, 李玉賢), Princess Gyeonghyeon (경현공주) (1530 – 1584). Husband: Sin Ui (신의, 申檥)
 Grandson − Sin Sa-jeong (신사정, 申士楨)
 Son − Yi Hwan, King Myeongjong (3 July 1534 – 3 August 1567) (이환 경원대군). Wife: Queen Insun of the Cheongseong Sim clan (인순왕후 심씨, 仁順王后 沈氏) (27 June 1532 – 12 February 1575)
 Grandson − Yi Bu, Crown Prince Sunhoe (순회세자 이부, 順懷世子 李暊) (1 July 1551 – 6 October 1563)
 Daughter − Princess Insun (1542 – 1545) (인순공주)

In popular culture
Portrayed by Kim Hye-ja in the 1985 MBC TV series The Wind Orchid.
Portrayed by Jeon In-hwa in the 2001 SBS TV series Ladies of the Palace.
Portrayed by Park Jeong-sook in the 2003 MBC TV series Dae Jang Geum.
Portrayed by Lee Duk-Hee in the 2008 KBS2 TV series Hometown of Legends.
Portrayed by Park Ji-young in the 2013 KBS2 TV series The Fugitive of Joseon.
 Portrayed by Kim Young-ae in the 2016 JTBC TV series Mirror of the Witch.
 Portrayed by Kim Mi-sook in the 2016 MBC TV series The Flower in Prison.
 Portrayed by Lee Kyung-jin in the 2019 TV Chosun series Joseon Survival Period.

See also
 Jungjong of Joseon
 Myeongjong of Joseon
 Yun Won-hyeong – Munjeong's younger brother 
 Korean Buddhism
 Queen Jeonghui – Munjeong's ascendant through her father 
 Queen Janggyeong – Munjeong's relative

References

External links
 

16th-century women rulers
1501 births
1565 deaths
House of Yi
Regents of Korea
Royal consorts of the Joseon dynasty
Korean queens consort
Buddhism and women
Papyeong Yun clan